Plagiostira is a North American genus of shield-backed katydids in the family Tettigoniidae. There are at least three described species in Plagiostira.  It is the only genus in the monotypic tribe Plagiostirini Storozhenko, 1994.

Species
These three species belong to the genus Plagiostira:
 Plagiostira albonotata Scudder, 1876 (white-marked shieldback) - type species
 Plagiostira gillettei Caudell, 1907 (Gillette's shieldback)
 Plagiostira mescaleroensis Tinkham, 1960 (mescalero shieldback)

References

Further reading

 

Tettigoniinae
Articles created by Qbugbot